John Irwin McGiver (November 5, 1913 – September 9, 1975) was an American character actor who made more than a hundred appearances in television and motion pictures over a two-decade span from 1955 to 1975.

The owl-faced, portly character actor with his mid-Atlantic accent and precise diction, was often cast as pompous Englishmen and other stuffy, aristocratic and bureaucratic types. He was known for his performances in such films as Breakfast at Tiffany's (1961); The Manchurian Candidate (1962), Who's Minding the Store? (1963) and Man's Favorite Sport? (1964). He appeared on many television shows and commercials during the 1960s and early 1970s, including the first of a long running popular series of commercials for the American Express charge card ("Do you know me?").

Early life
McGiver was born in Manhattan, New York City, the son of Irish immigrants. He graduated from the Jesuit-run  Regis High School in Manhattan in 1932.

He earned a B.A. in English from Fordham University in 1938 and master's degrees from Columbia University and Catholic University. He became an English teacher and worked as an actor and director in New York's Irish Repertory Theater. He interrupted those activities and enlisted in the U.S. Army in 1942 and served as an officer in the U.S. Army's 7th Armored Division in Europe during World War II. Returning to civilian life, he continued to teach English and speech at Christopher Columbus High School in the Bronx and worked occasionally in off-Broadway plays until 1955, when he became a full-time actor.

Career
In 1959, McGiver appeared in the episode "The Assassin" of NBC's espionage drama Five Fingers. In 1962, he appeared as Gramps in the episode "The Seventh Day of Creation" of the NBC medical drama about psychiatry, The Eleventh Hour. He appeared in the Alfred Hitchcock Presents episodes "Six People No Music" and "Fatal Figures", and  the Twilight Zone episode "Sounds and Silences". In 1971 he guest-starred in Alias Smith and Jones (season 1, episode 8, 'A Fistful of Diamonds'). In 1964, he appeared  in Man's Favorite Sport?. Between 1963 and 1964, McGiver appeared in five episodes of The Patty Duke Show as J.R. Castle, who was Martin Lane's boss at the fictional newspaper The Chronicle.

In the 1964–1965 television season, McGiver played the widower Walter Burnley, the head of the complaint department of a fictitious Los Angeles department store in the CBS sitcom Many Happy Returns. He was also in an episode of Gilligan's Island in 1966, "The Man With a Net". He also made one guest appearance on ABC's hit fantasy sitcom Bewitched.  McGiver later played the role of an unhinged religious fanatic, Mr. O'Daniel, in the 1969 film Midnight Cowboy.

Personal life
 
McGiver was married to Ruth Schmigelsky from 1947 until his death; they had ten children: Brigit, Maria, Terry, Basil, Clare, Oliver, Ian, Clemens, Boris, and Cornelia. Boris, the ninth child in the McGivers' large family, followed in his father's footsteps, working as a professional actor in films and on television since 1987.

Death
McGiver, at age 61, died of a heart attack on September 9, 1975 at his home in West Fulton, New York.  His remains were cremated.

Selected filmography

 The Man in the Raincoat (1957) - O'Brien
 Love in the Afternoon (1957) (with Gary Cooper, Audrey Hepburn and Maurice Chevalier) - Monsieur X
 I Married a Woman (1958) - Girard - Sutton's Lawyer
 Once Upon a Horse... (1958) - Mr. Tharp
 The Gazebo  (1959) (with Glenn Ford and Debbie Reynolds) - Sam Thorpe
 Love in a Goldfish Bowl (1961) - Dr. Frawley
 Breakfast at Tiffany's (1961) (with Audrey Hepburn and George Peppard) - Tiffany's Salesman
 Bachelor in Paradise (1961) (with Bob Hope) - Austin Palfrey
 Mr. Hobbs Takes a Vacation (1962) (with James Stewart and Maureen O'Hara) - Martin Turner
 The Manchurian Candidate (1962) (with Frank Sinatra, Laurence Harvey and Janet Leigh) - Senator Thomas Jordan
 Period of Adjustment (1962) (with Jane Fonda and Jim Hutton) - Stewart P. McGill
 Who's Got the Action? (1962) (with Dean Martin and Lana Turner) - Judge Fogel
 Something's Got to Give (1962) (aborted Marilyn Monroe film) - The Judge
 My Six Loves (1963) (with Debbie Reynolds) - Judge Harris
 Johnny Cool (1963) (with Henry Silva and Elizabeth Montgomery) - Oscar B. 'Oby' Hinds
 Take Her, She's Mine (1963) (with James Stewart and Sandra Dee) - Hector G. Ivor
 Who's Minding the Store? (1963) (with Jerry Lewis) - Mr. John P. Tuttle
 Man's Favorite Sport? (1964) (with Rock Hudson and Paula Prentiss) - William Cadwalader
 A Global Affair (1964) (with Bob Hope) - Mr. Snifter
 Marriage on the Rocks (1965) (with Frank Sinatra, Deborah Kerr and Dean Martin) - Shad Nathan
 Made in Paris (1966) (Louis Jourdan) - Roger Barclay
 The Glass Bottom Boat (1966) (with Doris Day and Rod Taylor) - Ralph Goodwin
 The Spirit Is Willing (1967) (with Sid Caesar and Vera Miles) - Uncle George
 Fitzwilly (1967) (with Dick Van Dyke) - Albert
 Midnight Cowboy (1969) (with Jon Voight and Dustin Hoffman) - Mr. O'Daniel
 Lawman (1971) (with Burt Lancaster) - Sabbath Mayor Sam Bolden
 Arnold (1973) (with Roddy McDowall) - Governor
 Mame (1974) (with Lucille Ball) - Mr. Babcock
 The Apple Dumpling Gang (1975) (with Don Knotts and Tim Conway) - Leonard Sharpe

Television

McGiver was a regular performer on
 McKeever & the Colonel, 1962–1963
 Many Happy Returns, 1964–1965 (lead role)
 Mr. Terrific, 1967
 The Jimmy Stewart Show, 1971–1972

McGiver also appeared on
 Alfred Hitchcock Presents ("Fatal Figures", "Six People, No Music")
 The Tab Hunter Show (episode "My Brother, the Hero," 1960)
 The Barbara Stanwyck Show ("The Golden Acres", 1961)
 Bonanza ("Land Grab", 1961)
 The Twilight Zone (two episodes: "The Bard", "Sounds and Silences")
 The Lucy Show ("Lucy is Kangaroo for a Day", 1963)
 The Patty Duke Show (5 episodes)
 The Rogues (1965)
 Voyage to the Bottom of the Sea (episode "The X Factor")
 The Fugitive (episode "The End Game")
 The Dick Van Dyke Show (“See Rob Write, Write Rob Write”, 1965)
 The Beverly Hillbillies ("Granny Versus the Weather Bureau")
 Gidget ("One More for the Road", 1966)
 The Man from U.N.C.L.E. ("The Birds and the Bees Affair", 1966)
 I Dream of Jeannie ("Jeannie Breaks the Bank", 1966)
 Gilligan's Island ("Man With a Net", 1966)
 Honey West ("Mr Brillig", 1966)
 The Wild Wild West ("The Night of the Turncoat," 1967)
 The High Chaparral ("Ebenezer," 1968)
 Bewitched ("Mother-in-Law of the Year", 1971)
 Alias Smith and Jones ("A Fistful of Diamonds", 1971)
 Twas the Night Before Christmas (as voice of The Mayor)
 Ellery Queen ("The Adventure of Miss Aggie's Farewell Performance", 1975) - (final appearance)

Stage
Broadway theatre roles included: 
 A Thurber Carnival, 1960
 The Front Page, 1969–1970

References

External links

1913 births
1975 deaths
20th-century American male actors
American male film actors
American male stage actors
American male television actors
American male voice actors
United States Army personnel of World War II
American people of Irish descent
Catholic University of America alumni
Columbia University alumni
Fordham University alumni
Male actors from New York City
People from Manhattan
People from Fulton, Schoharie County, New York
Regis High School (New York City) alumni
United States Army officers